The Groover-Stewart Drug Company Building (also known as the McKesson-Robbins Drug Company Building) is a historic site in Jacksonville, Florida. It is located at 25 North Market Street. On December 30, 1992, it was added to the U.S. National Register of Historic Places.

Current Use 
In January 2016, the Groover-Stewart Drug Company Building was purchased by workspace provider Novel Coworking, which renovated the building's interior to offer private offices and co-working space for small businesses.

References

External links
 Duval County listings at National Register of Historic Places
 Florida's Office of Cultural and Historical Programs
 Duval County listings
 Florida Public Defenders' Office

Office buildings in Jacksonville, Florida
Buildings and structures in Jacksonville, Florida
History of Jacksonville, Florida
National Register of Historic Places in Jacksonville, Florida